Rafflesia tuan-mudae is a member of the Rafflesiaceae family. It lives as a parasite within the Tetrastigma vine. The enormous flowers may reach over 1 m in diameter. The buds normally emerge where the vine is growing along the ground, unlike some of the other Rafflesia species whose buds can emerge from vines hanging in the air.

In the Malaysian language, tuan-mudae translates as 'Beloved or young Prince' after Charles Brooke the British Rajah of Sarawak. Locally the flower is referred to as bunga pakma - "bunga" means "flower" in Malaysian.

Description
Typically the flowers are around 60 cm in diameter opening from a 20 cm bud. Occasionally these buds reach 30 cm in diameter in which case a flower nearly 1 m across may form. It is considered to be the world's largest recorded flower; the previous largest was found at the same site, so may be from the same plant.

At an easily accessible locality observed often for a few years in the Gunung Raja (mountains) straddling the border between Malaysia and Indonesia in western Borneo, southwest of Kuching, in the early 1930s, it was found that the plants bloomed continuously throughout the year -at least in 1933, which was apparently a good year for rafflesias throughout Indonesia. Having said that, it was necessary to be there at the right time to photograph the flowers before they wilted, so quickly did this happen.

Ecology
The flowers can be found emerging from liana-like vines, specifically Tetrastigma rafflesiae and Tetrastigma diepenhorstii. The seeds reach the host plant by an unknown animal vector, penetrate the tissue of the root and grow inside the host tissue for an indefinite period of time before buds develop. The bud develops for nine months, before it becomes a gigantic orange to red flower. It stays in full bloom for just seven days. The main pollinator for this flower are flies. All Rafflesia flowers emit a rotting meat stench attracting pollinators, although the smell of R. tuan-mudae is comparatively mild. However, they are no less effective at attracting these flies, upon whose back pollen is deposited.

Male and female flowers can only be identified by fingering under the central disk for the anthers. However, visitors are encouraged not to touch or handle the buds in particular, as they are fragile and may die.

Distribution

In the 1910s, only a limited number of localities where the species had been found were known, but a number of new finds between then and 1935, especially in West Kalimantan, had expanded the distribution and the number of places that could be visited, albeit that some were/are quite remote.

In Sarawak, one of the easiest locations to see R. tuan-mudae is at Gunung Gading National Park, at the park headquarters or near Waterfall 7. It can also be seen at Lanjak-Entimau Wildlife Sanctuary.

References

External links
 

Plants described in 1868
tuan-mudae
Taxa named by Odoardo Beccari